Marius Copil was the defending champion, but lost in the quarterfinal to Pierre-Hugues Herbert.

Herbert won the title, defeating Vincent Millot in the final, 7–5, 6–4.

Seeds

Draw

Finals

Top half

Bottom half

References
 Main Draw
 Qualifying Draw

Open BNP Paribas Banque de Bretagne - Singles
2014 Singles